Richard Edwards may refer to:

Arts and entertainment
 Richard Edwardes (1525–1566), English poet, dramatist and composer, alleged illegitimate son of Henry VIII of England
 Richard Edwards (musician), freelance trombone player and composer
 Richard Edwards, lead singer and songwriter of the band Margot & the Nuclear So and So's
 Richey James Edwards, missing songwriter and rhythm guitarist of Welsh band the Manic Street Preachers
 Dickon Edwards (born 1971), diarist and front man of the band Fosca
 Richie Edwards (born 1974), latter-day bassist for The Darkness
 Rick Edwards (born 1979), British TV presenter

Military
 Richard Edwards (Royal Navy officer, died 1773), Commodore for the Canadian province of Newfoundland and Labrador for 1745
 Richard Edwards (Royal Navy officer, died 1795) (c. 1715–1795), Commodore for the Canadian province of Newfoundland and Labrador for 1757 and again in 1779
 Richard S. Edwards (1885–1956), United States Navy admiral

Politics
 Richard M. Edwards (1822–1907), member of the Tennessee House of Representatives, 1861–1862
 Richard Edwards (educator) (1822–1908), Welsh American superintendent and college president
 Richard Edwards (Australian politician) (1842–1915), 20th-century Australian politician
 Richard Edwards (Welsh politician) (born 1956), former Welsh Labour politician

Sports
 Dick Edwards (basketball) (1930–1981), American basketball coach
 Dick Edwards (footballer) (born 1942), English former footballer
 Richard Edwards (footballer) (born 1983), Jamaican footballer
 Prof Edwards (Richard Martin Edwards, born 1940), cricketer

Others
 Richard Edwards (fashion company), a New York fashion design company

Edwards, Richard